6042 Cheshirecat ( or ), provisional designation , is an eccentric, rare-type asteroid and large Mars-crosser from the outer regions of the asteroid belt, approximately 14 kilometers in diameter. It was discovered by Japanese astronomers Akira Natori and Takeshi Urata at the JCPM Yakiimo Station on 23 November 1990. It was named for the Cheshire Cat from the novel Alice's Adventures in Wonderland.

Classification and orbit 

Cheshirecat is a Mars-crossing asteroid, as it crosses the orbit of Mars at 1.666 AU. It orbits the Sun at a distance of 1.65–4.43 AU once every 5 years and 4 months (1,936 days). Its orbit has an eccentricity of 0.46 and an inclination of 16° with respect to the ecliptic.

The body's observation arc begins 11 years prior to its official discovery observation, with a precovery taken at the Siding Spring Observatory in August 1979.

Physical characteristics 

According to photometry from the Sloan Digital Sky Survey, Cheshirecat is a rare K-type asteroid. The asteroid has also been characterized as a XL-type – which transitions from the X-type to the L-type asteroid – by Pan-STARRS photometric survey.

Lightcurves 

In December 2006, a rotational lightcurve of Cheshirecat was obtained from photometric observations by American astronomer Robert Stephens. Lightcurve analysis gave a rotation period of 10.050 hours with a brightness variation of 0.40 magnitude. In September 2011, another lightcurve, obtained at the Oakley Southern Sky Observatory, Australia, gave a concurring period of 10.050 hours and an amplitude of 0.20

Diameter and albedo 

According to the survey carried out by the Japanese Akari satellite, Cheshirecat measures 14.12 kilometers in diameter and its surface has an albedo of 0.109. The Collaborative Asteroid Lightcurve Link assumes a standard albedo for carbonaceous asteroids of 0.057 and calculates a diameter of 14.64 kilometers based on an absolute magnitude of 12.9.

Naming 

This minor planet was named for the Cheshire Cat, a cat appearing in Lewis Carroll's famous fairy tale Alice in Wonderland. The cat is known for its distinctive mischievous grins and eyes that linger after it has already faded away. The asteroid's name and citation was proposed by co-discoverer Takeshi Urata. The approved naming citation was published by the Minor Planet Center on 2 February 1999.

References

External links 
 Asteroid Lightcurve Database (LCDB), query form (info )
 Dictionary of Minor Planet Names, Google books
 Asteroids and comets rotation curves, CdR – Observatoire de Genève, Raoul Behrend
 Discovery Circumstances: Numbered Minor Planets (5001)-(10000) – Minor Planet Center
 
 

 

006042
Discoveries by Akira Natori
Discoveries by Takeshi Urata
Named minor planets
19901123